Taylor's Mill Historic District, a  historic district featuring the gristmill Taylor's Mill, is located along Taylor's Mill Road and Rockaway Road near Oldwick in Readington Township, Hunterdon County, New Jersey. It was added to the National Register of Historic Places on June 11, 1992 for its significance in architecture, exploration/settlement, industry, and military.

History
Colonel John Taylor (1744–1811) built this grist and flouring mill  on the Rockaway Creek. It supplied grain for the Continental Army during the American Revolutionary War. The mill had many subsequent owners, including Eleanor and Manning McCrea.

Gallery

See also
 McCrea Mills, New Jersey

References

External links
 
 
 
  Taylor's Mill Historic District Marker / Colonel Taylor's Gristmill

Readington Township, New Jersey
Tewksbury Township, New Jersey
National Register of Historic Places in Hunterdon County, New Jersey
Historic districts on the National Register of Historic Places in New Jersey
New Jersey Register of Historic Places
1760 establishments in New Jersey